Gilberto Carillo (16 August 1951 – 1996) was an amateur light-heavyweight boxer from Cuba who won a silver medal at the 1972 Olympics. His elder brother Nancio was also an Olympic boxer, and his niece Nancy was an Olympic volleyball player.

References

1951 births
1996 deaths
Olympic boxers of Cuba
Olympic silver medalists for Cuba
Boxers at the 1972 Summer Olympics
Olympic medalists in boxing
Cuban male boxers
Medalists at the 1972 Summer Olympics
Light-heavyweight boxers
20th-century Cuban people